The 1992–93 NCAA Division I men's basketball season began in November 1992 and ended with the Final Four at the Louisiana Superdome in New Orleans, Louisiana. The North Carolina Tar Heels earned their third national championship by defeating the Michigan Wolverines 77–71 on April 5, 1993.

Season headlines 

 Michigan's Fab Five played in the National Championship Game for the second straight season.
 North Carolina coach Dean Smith won his second national championship and the program's third overall.

Major rule changes 
Beginning in 1992–93, the following rules changes were implemented.

Season outlook

Pre-season polls 
The top 25 from the AP Poll and Coaches Poll during the pre-season.

Conference membership changes 

These schools joined new conferences for the 1992–93 season.

Regular season

Statistical leaders

Conference standings

Postseason tournaments

NCAA Tournament

Final Four - Louisiana Superdome, New Orleans, Louisiana 

* Michigan's entire 1992–93 schedule results were vacated, on November 7, 2002, as part of the settlement of the University of Michigan basketball scandal. Unlike forfeiture, a vacated game does not result in the other school being credited with a win, only with Michigan removing the wins from its own record.

National Invitation Tournament

NIT Semifinals and Final

Award winners

Consensus All-American teams

Major player of the year awards 
 Wooden Award: Calbert Cheaney, Indiana
 Naismith Award: Calbert Cheaney, Indiana
 Associated Press Player of the Year: Calbert Cheaney, Indiana
 UPI Player of the Year: Calbert Cheaney, Indiana
 NABC Player of the Year: Calbert Cheaney, Indiana
 Oscar Robertson Trophy (USBWA): Calbert Cheaney, Indiana
 Adolph Rupp Trophy: Calbert Cheaney, Indiana
 Sporting News Player of the Year: Calbert Cheaney, Indiana

Major freshman of the year awards 
 USBWA National Freshman of the Year: Jason Kidd, California

Major coach of the year awards 
 Associated Press Coach of the Year: Eddie Fogler, Vanderbilt
 UPI Coach of the Year: Eddie Fogler, Vanderbilt
 Henry Iba Award (USBWA): Eddie Fogler, Vanderbilt
 NABC Coach of the Year: Eddie Fogler, Vanderbilt
 Naismith College Coach of the Year: Dean Smith, North Carolina
 CBS/Chevrolet Coach of the Year: Eddie Fogler, Vanderbilt
 Sporting News Coach of the Year: Eddie Fogler, Vanderbilt

Other major awards 
 Frances Pomeroy Naismith Award (Best player under 6'0): Sam Crawford, New Mexico State
 Robert V. Geasey Trophy (Top player in Philadelphia Big 5): Aaron McKie, Temple
 NIT/Haggerty Award (Top player in New York City metro area): Terry Dehere, Seton Hall

References